The Budele is a left tributary of the river Olteț in Romania. It flows into the Olteț in Zătreni.

References

 Comuna Zătreni

Rivers of Romania
Rivers of Vâlcea County